The 2012 PBA All-Star Weekend was the annual all-star weekend of the Philippine Basketball Association (PBA)'s 2011–12 PBA season. The events were held from May 10 to 13, 2012 at the Ilocos Norte Centennial Arena, Laoag, Ilocos Norte.

Highlighting the weekend was the return of the Rookies-Sophomores-Juniors (RSJ) vs. Veterans format of the All-Star game, after being dropped following the 2001 event.

Mark Macapagal and Jonas Villanueva achieved three-peats as they were again victorious in the Three-point Shootout and Obstacle Challenge, respectively.

The players from Talk 'N Text Tropang Texters were pulled out from their respective events, days before the start of the weekend.

Friday events

Obstacle Challenges
Time in seconds.

Gold represents the current champion.
Jonas Villanueva won his three-peat for the Obstacle Challenge.

Three-point Shootout

Mark Macapagal won his three-peat for the Three-point Shootout.

Greats vs. Stalwarts
Team Greats vs. Team Stalwarts will be the newest event for the All-Star Weekend. Team Greats and Team Stalwart will play with 4 PBA Legends each.

Rosters

Team Stalwarts:

Asi Taulava (Meralco)
Sean Anthony (Powerade)
Peter June Simon (B-Meg)
Mark Cardona (Meralco)
Cyrus Baguio (Alaska)
Jeffrei Chan (Rain or Shine)
Allan Caidic (Legends)
Leo Isaac (Legends)
Kenneth Duremdes (Legends)
Johnny Abarrientos (Legends)
Playing coach: Allan Caidic

Team Greats:

Danny Ildefonso (Petron)
Nino Canaleta (Ginebra)
Danny Seigle (Barako)
Joseph Yeo (Petron)
Mike Cortez (Ginebra)
Sol Mercado (Meralco)
Willie Miller (Barako)
Alvin Patrimonio (Legends)
Ato Agustin (Legends)
Jojo Lastimosa (Legends)
Olsen Racela (Legends)
Playing coach: Ato Agustin

Game

Sunday events

Slamdunk Contest

Defending champion Kelly Williams together with teammate Japeth Aguilar didn't attend the All-star weekend due to their team management's decision.

RSJs vs. Veterans

Rosters

Asi Taulava of Meralco replaced Ranidel de Ocampo in the line-up because the entire Talk 'N Text team chose not to participate at the All-star Weekend.
Chot Reyes was replaced by Ryan Gregorio as Veterans coach because the entire Talk 'N Text team chose not to participate at the All-star Weekend.
 Mark Caguioa of Team Veterans did not play because of an eye injury.

Game

James Yap was named the game's most valuable player.

References

See also
2011–12 PBA season
Philippine Basketball Association
Philippine Basketball Association All-Star Weekend

Philippine Basketball Association All-Star Weekend
Sports in Ilocos Norte